Woburn may refer to:

Places

Caribbean
 Woburn, Village, Grenada, Caribbean (W.I) 
 Woburn, Marine Protected Area, Grenada, Caribbean (W.I)

Canada
 Woburn, Toronto, Ontario, Canada 
 Woburn Collegiate Institute
 Woburn, Quebec, Canada

England
 Woburn, Bedfordshire
 Woburn Abbey
 Woburn Safari Park
 Woburn Sands, Buckinghamshire
 Woburn Golf and Country Club, in Little Brickhill, Buckinghamshire
 Woburn Place, London
 Woburn Square, London
 Woburn Walk, London

New Zealand
 Woburn, New Zealand

United States 
 Woburn, Massachusetts, United States
 Woburn Memorial High School
 Woburn (MBTA station), a former station in the Boston area, closed in 1981
 Woburn, Illinois, United States